Jon Holst-Christensen (born 16 June 1968) is a retired male badminton player from Denmark.

Career

Summer Olympics
Jon Holst-Christensen competed in badminton at the 1992 Summer Olympics in men's doubles with Thomas Lund. In the first round they defeated Dean Galt and Kerrin Harrison of New Zealand and in second round they were beaten by Razif Sidek and Jalani Sidek of Malaysia.

He also competed in badminton at the 1996 Summer Olympics in men's doubles with the same partner. They had a bye in the first round and lost against Ha Tae-kwon and Kang Kyung-jin of Korea in the second round.

Achievements

World Championships 
Men's doubles

European Championships 
Men's doubles

IBF World Grand Prix
The World Badminton Grand Prix sanctioned by International Badminton Federation (IBF) from 1983 to 2006.

Men's doubles

External links
Jon Holst-Christensen's Profile - Badminton.dk

1968 births
Living people
Danish male badminton players
Olympic badminton players of Denmark
Badminton players at the 1992 Summer Olympics
Badminton players at the 1996 Summer Olympics
Badminton players at the 2000 Summer Olympics
World No. 1 badminton players
People from Ringsted
Sportspeople from Region Zealand